Williamson Sylvester Stuckey Jr. (born May 25, 1935) is an American businessman and former politician. He is a former member of the Democratic Party. His father, W. S. Stuckey Sr., founded the Stuckey's chain of gift shops, of which Stuckey Jr. became president and CEO in 1985. He retired in 2019 and his daughter Ethel "Stephanie" Stuckey took over as President and CEO of the company.

Born in Eastman, Georgia, Stuckey graduated from Woodward Academy in 1952. He earned a B.B.A. in 1956 and a LL.B. in 1959, both from the University of Georgia. He was president of his family's various business holdings, including Stuckey's Stores, Stuckey Pecan Company, Stuckey Investments, and Stuckey Timberlands. He was elected as a Democrat to the Ninetieth and to the four succeeding Congresses (January 3, 1967 – January 3, 1977). He was not a candidate for reelection in 1976.

References

1935 births
Living people
American chief executives of food industry companies
American retail chief executives
People from Eastman, Georgia
University of Georgia alumni
Woodward Academy alumni
Democratic Party members of the United States House of Representatives from Georgia (U.S. state)
20th-century American businesspeople
20th-century American politicians
21st-century American businesspeople